Hell to Pay: Operation Downfall and the Invasion of Japan, 1945-1947 is a book by Dennis Giangreco. It is about Operation Downfall, the proposed invasion of Imperial Japan during World War II.

References

History books about World War II
Books about Japan
2009 non-fiction books